Platygyriella pringlei is a species of moss from the genus Platygyriella. It was discovered in the Americas (especially Mexico). Before the name Platygyriella pringlei, it was named Erythrodontium pringlei by Cardot.

References

Hypnaceae